"Surrender" is a single by Cheap Trick released in June 1978 from the album Heaven Tonight. It was the first Cheap Trick single to enter the Billboard Hot 100 chart, peaking at number 62. Its success in Japan, as well as the success of its preceding singles "Clock Strikes Ten" and "I Want You to Want Me", paved the way for Cheap Trick's concerts at Nippon Budokan in Tokyo in April 1978 which were recorded for Cheap Trick at Budokan, the group's most popular album.

Content
"Surrender" is a late 1970s teen anthem, describing the relations between the baby boomer narrator and his G.I. Generation parents. His mother frequently warns him about the girls he will meet, as he will never know what diseases he will catch from them, as exemplified by a rumor about "a soldier's [penis] falling off" as a result of "some Indonesian junk that's going around". The mother's expertise on such matters is endorsed by the father, who states that she served with the WACs in the Philippines, a claim which amazes the narrator, who had been under the impression the WACs only recruited "old maids" (and Mommy isn't one of those). The narrator then describes how his parents are weirder and hipper than many teens would believe. For example, the narrator describes how he discovers his "mom and dad are rolling on the couch" and listening to his Kiss records late at night ("rolling numbers, rock-and-rolling, got my Kiss records out") This mention was a thank you by Cheap Trick who were heavily supported by Kiss in their early days as a support band to Kiss.

Reception
Cash Box said it has "energetic drumming and excellent rhythm guitar work" and that "the singing is intriguing and melodic."  Record World predicted that it "could easily make it to the top of the pop charts with its catchy teenage refrain."

In the 2007 book Shake Some Action: The Ultimate Power Pop Guide, a section on Cheap Trick featured reviews on the top 20 stand-out tracks from the band. One track included was "Surrender", where the author John M. Borack wrote "A no-brainer selection, to be sure, but since I believe that it's clinically impossible to get tired of this rock and roll funhouse, it belongs here. A stone classic for the ages."

Rolling Stone deemed it "the ultimate Seventies teen anthem" and ranked it number 471 on its list of the "500 Greatest Songs of All Time" in 2010, number 465 in 2004, and number 365 in 2021. Classic Rock critic Malcolm Dome rated it as Cheap Trick's 2nd best song, saying that "the band found their mark and rhythm, mixing creative musicianship with a teen-friendly melody, all done with an effective eccentricity."  Classic Rock History critic Michael Quinn also rated it Cheap Trick's 2nd best song.

Personnel
Robin Zander – lead vocals and rhythm guitar
Rick Nielsen – lead guitar and backing vocals
Tom Petersson – bass and backing vocals
Bun E. Carlos – drums
Jai Winding – synthesizer

Chart performance

References

External links
BMI database listing artists with radio airplay for Surrender

Cheap Trick songs
Songs written by Rick Nielsen
Epic Records singles
1978 singles
Song recordings produced by Tom Werman
Songs used as jingles
1976 songs
Kiss (band)